Chirapsina expleta is a moth of the family Tortricidae. It is found in Assam, India.

References

Moths described in 1923
Archipini